Fishes of the World by the American ichthyologist Joseph S. Nelson (1937–2011) is a standard reference for fish systematics. Now in its fifth edition (2016), the work is a comprehensive overview of the diversity and classification of the 30,000-plus fish species known to science.

The book begins with a general overview of ichthyology, although it is not self-contained. After a short section on Chordata and non-fish taxa, the work lists all known fish families in a systematic fashion. Each family gets at least one paragraph, and usually a body outline drawing; large families have subfamilies and tribes described as well. Notable genera and species are mentioned, while the book generally does not deal with the species-level diversity. The complexities of the higher taxa are described succinctly, with many references for difficult points. The book does not involve color illustrations.

The fourth edition was the first to incorporate the wide use of DNA analysis, revising many earlier classifications.

The first edition appeared in 1976, the second in 1984, the third in 1994 (John Wiley & Sons), the fourth in March 2006, and the fifth in April 2016.

References

External links
 Fishes of the World (4th edition) Homepage
 Fishes of the World (5th edition) Homepage (includes updated classification)

Ichthyological literature
1976 non-fiction books
1984 non-fiction books
1994 non-fiction books
2006 non-fiction books
2016 non-fiction books
Wiley (publisher) books